Thoresby Hall is a grade I listed 19th-century country house in Budby, Nottinghamshire, some 2 miles (4 km) north of Ollerton. It is one of four neighbouring country houses and estates in the Dukeries in north Nottinghamshire all occupied by dukes at one time during their history. The hall is constructed of rock-faced ashlar with ashlar dressings. It is built in four storeys with a square floor plan surrounding a central courtyard, nine bays wide and eight bays deep.

History
Robert Pierrepont, 1st Earl of Kingston-upon-Hull acquired the Thoresby lands in 1633, but was killed in the Civil War in 1643. His son Henry Pierrepont, the 2nd Earl, built the first grand house, attributed to the architect Talman, about 1670. The house was remodelled for William Pierrepont, the 4th Earl, during 1685–87, probably by Benjamin Jackson, after the earl had been granted the right in 1683 to create the park by enclosure from Sherwood Forest. The house was the birthplace of Lady Mary Pierrepont, wife of Edward Wortley Montagu, in 1689.

The estate passed to Evelyn Pierrepont, 2nd Duke of Kingston-upon-Hull (1711–1773), who fought at the Battle of Culloden in 1746 and during whose ownership the house was destroyed by fire that same year. Twenty years later the architect John Carr during 1767–1772 built a new house on the same site. Humphry Repton landscaped the park at the same time.

When the 2nd Duke died in 1773 he left the estate to his wife, Elizabeth Chudleigh, the former wife of the Earl of Bristol. After a very public court case, she was declared married bigamously to the duke and obliged to surrender the property on her death in 1786 to the duke's nephew, Charles Medows, a Royal Navy officer. He adopted the name Pierrepont and later became the 1st Earl Manvers.

In 1868, Sydney Pierrepont, the 3rd Earl Manvers, commissioned the celebrated country house architect Anthony Salvin to demolish the house after just a hundred years and replace it with the present house, erected  to the north. The house descended to  Gervas Pierrepont, 6th Earl Manvers  who died in 1955 without a male heir and the title thereby became extinct. The house remained with his wife, Countess Manvers, and their daughter Lady Rozelle Raynes.

To minimise a perceived threat from coal mining subsidence the buildings were sold to the National Coal Board in 1979 and sold on the open market ten years later. In 2020 these fears came to light when abandoned mine workings subsided below the property, which required repairs from the Coal Authority. The core of the Thoresby furniture collection was retained by the family who built a new house on the other side of the lake, while the remainder was sold at auction by Sotheby's in 1989. After a number of owners it was acquired by Warner Leisure Hotels. The  Salvin house had a new bedroom wing added before opening as a 200-room country house hotel with spa facilities in 2000.

The Royal Lancers and Nottinghamshire Yeomanry Museum occupies part of the courtyard which is now open to the public as a retail space.

References

External links 
 
 History from Worksop Heritage Trail 
 A short history from nottshistory.org
 A longer history from the same site
 The official Warner website about the hotel
 The website for the Estate and Courtyard

1871 establishments in England
Houses completed in 1871
The Dukeries
Hotels in Nottinghamshire
History of Nottinghamshire
Hotel spas
Anthony Salvin buildings
Tourist attractions in Nottinghamshire
Grade I listed houses
Grade I listed buildings in Nottinghamshire
Pierrepont family
Anthony Salvin
Country house hotels